The 1976 English cricket season was the 77th in which the County Championship had been an official competition. Clive Lloyd adopted a new approach to Test cricket as a battery of pace bowlers was used to intimidate the England batsmen. Lloyd adopted the tactic after his own team's experiences against Jeff Thomson and Dennis Lillee the previous year. England's batsmen were no match for Andy Roberts and Michael Holding, but even more worrying was a dearth of effective England bowlers and it was West Indian batsmen like Viv Richards and Gordon Greenidge who were the real stars of a long, hot, dry summer. Middlesex won the County Championship.

Honours
County Championship – Middlesex
Gillette Cup – Northamptonshire
Sunday League – Kent
Benson & Hedges Cup – Kent
Minor Counties Championship – Durham
Second XI Championship – Kent II 
Wisden – Mike Brearley, Gordon Greenidge, Michael Holding, Vivian Richards, Bob Taylor

Test series

After two drawn games in the first two tests, the West Indians won the remaining three test matches to convincingly win the series 3–0.

County Championship

Gillette Cup

Benson & Hedges Cup

Sunday League

Leading batsmen

Leading bowlers

References

Annual reviews
 Playfair Cricket Annual 1977
 Wisden Cricketers' Almanack 1977

External sources
 CricketArchive – season and tournament itineraries

English cricket seasons in the 20th century